Helcogramma shinglensis is a species of triplefin from the genus Helcogramma. It has been recorded only from the Gulf of Mannar in the eastern Indian Ocean. It is accepted as a valid species by Fishbase but the Catalog of Fishes treats this taxon as synonymous with Helcogramma obtusirostris.

References

shinglensis
Fish described in 1971